Marnus Potgieter (born 20 June 1999) is a South African rugby union player for the  in the United Rugby Championship and in the Currie Cup. His regular position is centre or wing.

Potgieter was named in the  squad for the Super Rugby Unlocked competition.

Honours
 Currie Cup winner 2020–21

References

South African rugby union players
1999 births
Living people
Rugby union centres
Rugby union wings
Blue Bulls players
Bulls (rugby union) players
Sharks (Currie Cup) players
Sharks (rugby union) players